Colin John Bond  (born 24 February 1942) is a retired Australian racing driver.  Bond reached the highest levels in Australian motorsport in 1969 when he was recruited by Harry Firth to the newly formed Holden Dealer Team. He quickly found success, winning the 1969 Hardie-Ferodo 500 mile race (now the Bathurst 1000) at Bathurst, New South Wales in a Holden Monaro.

Bond was a particularly versatile driver, also finding success in the Australian Rally Championship, winning the title in 1971, 1972 and 1974 driving a Holden Torana. Bond also won the 1975 Australian Touring Car Championship in a Holden Torana and was inducted into the V8 Supercars Hall of Fame in 2002.

Early career
 Bond initially made a reputation as a hillclimber with three NSW Hillclimb titles in 1965-67 driving a Lynx-Peugeot S/C. Also known as a rally driver he was relatively unknown in circuit racing circles apart from a few forays racing various Isuzu Belletts, when he was chosen to partner Tony Roberts in one of three Holden Dealer Team entered Holden Monaros for the 1969 Hardie-Ferodo 500 at Bathurst. On a day when the Fords crumbled with unsuitable tyres for the race, the HDT stood strong, putting all three Monaros (including one driven by Des West and Peter Brock which finished third) into the top six positions with Bond and Roberts winning.

Torana GTR XU-1 

The nimble 6-cylinder Torana GTR XU-1 debuted in late 1970 and in 1971 Bond began racking up an impressive list of race and rally titles in his Torana. He secured the Manufacturer's Championship for Holden by winning 3 out of 5 rounds, including the Sandown 250 enduro in his XU-1. He also won the Australian Rally Championship and the Southern Cross Rally, along with the South Pacific Touring Series that year.

Late in 1971 Bond had a couple of drives with Frank Matich's F5000 team. One was in the Australian Grand Prix at Warwick Farm and driving in a wet practice session Bond put in lap times seconds faster than his more experienced F5000 rivals. After his open-wheeler stint he opted to stay with the Holden Dealer Team.

The following year Bond won the Australian Rally Championship for the second year in a row. Bond also won the Catalina Park rallycross series, while on the bitumen he won the Toby Lee Series and Sun-7 Gold Medal. In 1973 he again won the Sun-7 series at Amaroo Park.

 In 1974, as well as winning his third national Rally Championship, Bond won his third consecutive Sun-7 Chesterfield Series against a strong challenge by Bob Morris.

Torana L34  

In late 1974, driving the new Holden Torana SL/R 5000, he contributed to Holden's victory in the Australian Manufacturers' Championship, again winning three out of five rounds.

Peter Brock left the Holden Dealer Team at the end of 1974 so for the 1975 season Colin Bond was the team's No.1 driver. That year he won his only Australian Touring Car Championship in the new L34 version of the SL/R 5000 Torana, and also won his second South Pacific Touring Car Series. At Bathurst Bond claimed pole position from the Ford XB Falcon GT Hardtop of Allan Moffat and led for much of the early part of the race until a broken axle at half distance put him too far back to challenge the similar Torana Peter Brock and Brian Sampson.

Bond was involved in a dramatic finish in 1976 at the Bathurst 1000. Late in the race when it seemed Bond, in the Holden Dealer Team Torana L34, had the race sewn up he was forced to pull into the pits with fanbelt trouble allowing the Bob Morris Torana to take the lead. In the final laps Morris's co-driver, British touring car ace John Fitzpatrick, nursed home an ailing car trailing smoke ahead of Bond's Torana which finished about 40 seconds behind.

In 1987, motoring writer Bill Tuckey in his book The Rise and Fall of Peter Brock claimed that there had been a lap scoring error in the 1976 race and that Colin Bond's Torana was the first car to complete the distance. Tuckey claimed Holden declined to challenge the result because a privately entered Holden team had won in such a memorable, emotional finish, and because Bob Morris' major sponsor was Ron Hodgson Motors, one of Sydney's leading Holden dealerships at the time. It remains however a contested footnote, Bob Morris denies that this was the case, claiming most team lap scorers agreed that the results were correct. Despite this, Bond's co-driver John Harvey believes that he and Bond did indeed win the race (Bond himself has kept a dignified silence), despite the official result still showing Morris and Fitzpatrick as race winners.

1-2 Formation Finish at Bathurst 

After 7 years with the Holden Dealer Team, Bond shocked the establishment in 1977 when he left the HDT and joined Allan Moffat's Ford Dealers Team. Bond came close to becoming the first driver to achieve victories for both Holden and Ford Motor Company at the Bathurst 1000 (a feat which wouldn't be achieved until Steven Richards in 1999). He was driving the second of Moffat's Ford XC Falcon GS500 Hardtop's, with Moffat driving the lead car which was experiencing mechanical problems in the closing laps of the race (Moffat's Falcon had run out of brakes after they were given a caning by his co-driver, ex-Formula One driver and multiple 24 Hours of Le Mans winner Jacky Ickx). Although Bond had the opportunity to pass Moffat and take victory, he controversially chose to observe Moffat's team orders and allowed him to pass the line first in the now famous 1-2 formation finish.

Bond has stated in interviews since then that he regretted not taking victory from Moffat. Moffat himself later revealed that during the race he had offered Bond a drive in his Falcon which would have seen Bond not only win the race but finish second as well. Bond confirmed that he turned down Moffat's offer, preferring instead to stick to his own car which was co-driven by open wheel driver Alan Hamilton (Bond was to have driven with Gregg Hansford, but the Queenslander had to withdraw through injury suffered in a Motorcycle racing accident). Moffat also claimed that had the third placed Peter Janson / Larry Perkins Holden LX Torana SS A9X Hatchback or the similar Torana of fourth placed Peter and Phil Brock been on the same lap (both Torana's were one lap down) and closing in on the pair that Bond would have been free to pass him for the win if it meant that the Moffat Ford Dealers team won the race.

From 1977 to 1980 Bond ran the Ford works rally team, with Greg Carr and Bond driving the very competitive BDA Escort. The highlight for the Ford team was Greg Carr winning the 1978 Australian Rally Championship.

The 1980s 

During the 1980s Bond was less prominent than he had been the previous decade, due mainly as others recognised his engineering ability and he was hired to front smaller operations like Steve Masterton's Capri team, Alfa Romeo's three-year factory effort and in the 1990s Toyota's short-lived foray into Supertouring. But he did register two more Bathurst 1000 placings, finishing 3rd in 1983 with Allan Grice in a Roadways Racing Holden VH Commodore SS, and 1988; the latter occasion with  Formula One World Champion Alan Jones as co-driver in a Ford Sierra RS500. And in 1985 Bond and former motorcycle racer Gregg Hansford won their class and finished 7th outright at Bathurst in an Alfa Romeo GTV. He was also third in the 1981 and 1988 Australian Touring Car Championships, 1981 in a Ford Capri Mk.II for the Masterton Homes team and 1988 in a Ford Sierra RS500 in what was his first ATCC in an outright car since 1978.

Bond drove a great variety of machinery during this period including the Ford Capri, Chevrolet Camaro Z28, Triumph TR8, Alfa Romeo GTV, Alfa Romeo 75, Ford Sierra RS500, Toyota Corolla, and Porsche (including a Porsche 944 Turbo for Allan Hamilton's Porsche Cars Australia team in the 1982 and 1983 Australian GT Championships).

Bond also teamed with then open wheel racer Andrew Miedecke to drive a John Fitzpatrick Racing Porsche 962 in the 1984 Sandown 1000. The race, which was the final round of the 1984 World Endurance Championship, was the first ever FIA world championship motor race held in Australia. Bond qualified the car in 11th place, 4.4 seconds slower than pole winner Bellof in his Rothmans Porsche 956B. Bondy and "Mad Andy" then drove a steady race, staying out of trouble, to record a 6th-place finish at Melbourne's Sandown Park. Bond would claim that racing the 962 was "A lot of fun".

Wins in the Caltex Sierra 

Colin Bond made an impact on the Touring Car Championship in 1990, winning two consecutive rounds of the championship at Lakeside and Mallala driving a Caltex sponsored Ford Sierra. Both these wins involved memorable drives where Bond came from behind to pass the leading cars one by one until taking the lead and holding off his rivals to win.

In 1994 Bond was lured back for one last tilt at the Bathurst 1000 by Fred Gibson, manager of the Winfield Racing Team. Driving a Holden VP Commodore with Swede Anders Olofsson, Bond briefly led the race early on when many cars were pitting to change tyres. He finished in 6th place on the same lap as the winning car.

Bond retired as a driver in 1994, but continued to contribute to the sport as a driving standards observer for V8 Supercar until he was replaced by Tomas Mezera after the 2006 season.

In the 1994 Queen's Birthday Honours Bond was awarded the Medal of the Order of Australia (OAM) for service to motor sport.

Career results

Complete Bathurst 500/1000 results

Complete Sandown Endurance results

Complete 24 Hours of Le Mans results

Complete World Endurance Championship results
(key) (Races in bold indicate pole position) (Races in italics indicate fastest lap)

Complete World Touring Car Championship results
(key) (Races in bold indicate pole position) (Races in italics indicate fastest lap)

† Not registered for series & points

Complete Asia-Pacific Touring Car Championship results
(key) (Races in bold indicate pole position) (Races in italics indicate fastest lap)

References

Australia's Greatest Motor Race 1960–1999 (Chevron) © 2000
Giant Killers 1972
Giant Killers 1973 - pgs 35, 63
Racing Car News October, 1976
The Rise and Fall of Peter Brock (Bill Tuckey) 1987
Highlights of Bathurst 1000–1993, 1994 DVD (Chevron)
Torana SL/R5000 DVD (Holden Motorsport/Chevron)
Formula 5000 in New Zealand and Australia by Wolfgang Klopfer - Pg 205
Sydney Morning Herald - 19 August 1973 - pg 15
The Age - 6 March 1973 - pg 10

External links
VESRIX

Australian rally drivers
Bathurst 1000 winners
Australian Touring Car Championship drivers
1942 births
Living people
Racing drivers from New South Wales
World Sportscar Championship drivers
Australian Endurance Championship drivers